"Please Stay" is a song by Australian singer and songwriter Kylie Minogue for her seventh studio album, Light Years (2000). The song was written by Minogue, Richard Stannard, Julian Gallagher, and John Themis and was produced by Stannard and Gallagher. Festival Mushroom Records and Parlophone released the song as the fourth single from Light Years on 11 December 2000. "Please Stay" is a disco song with a strong Latin pop influence. The song received generally positive reviews from music critics.

Commercially, the song peaked at number 10 in the United Kingdom and number 15 in Minogue's native Australia, where it was certified gold by the Australian Recording Industry Association (ARIA), selling over 35,000 copies. An accompanying music video was shot for the single, directed by James Frost and Alex Smith. It featured Minogue abandoning a bedroom to visit a group of partygoers in an underground room. The song has been performed live by Minogue on her KylieFever2002 and Showgirl: The Greatest Hits Tour.

Background
"Please Stay" was written by Kylie Minogue, Richard Stannard, Julian Gallagher, and John Themis and was produced by Stannard and Gallagher. The song was chosen as the fourth single from Light Years. "Please Stay" is a disco song, which features a strong Latin-pop style.

Reception

Peter Robinson from NME praised the song for being a "breezy little number, much like Kylie herself." Dooyoo.co.uk also gave it a positive review, writing, "With a slight drift from the camp disco, 'Please Stay' indulges in a light, fast acoustic sound, backed up by a thumping beat and lauded by soothing, inviting vocals from Minogue...she draws you into it and makes you feel like you're strutting the romantic streets of Paris."

"Please Stay" had moderate success worldwide. The song debuted at number fifteen on the Australian Singles Chart, but didn't receive much weeks on the charts, but managed to be certificated gold by the Australian Recording Industry of Australia (ARIA). The song debuted at number sixty-nine on the Dutch Top 40, but fell out the next week at seventy-seven. The song debuted at number forty-seven on the Swedish Singles Chart, staying for three weeks. The song had debuted at number ten on the UK Singles Chart, but did not go further, staying on the charts for seven weeks. As a result, the song didn't have as much success as the previous three singles.

Music video
A music video was shot by James Frost and Alex Smith. The clip opens with Minogue driving a car through the night, intercut with images of her lying on a round rotating bed whilst wearing a gold silk mini-dress with slashed sleeves. After the first chorus, Minogue gets up off the bed in order to pull on a candelabra, revealing the opening to a fireman's pole within the wall. Sliding down it, she comes out the other side into an underground room filled with partygoers, and her gold dress changed into an identical red one. Minogue commences a dance routine with the partygoers involving a pool table, until the clip fades out over images of a pinball machine featuring the "Light Years" album cover.

Live performances
Minogue performed a medley of "Spinning Around" and "Please Stay" on the Royal Variety Performance, which aired on 17 December 2000 by BBC One. She performed "Please Stay" on the KylieFever2002 tour, as part of the "In Your Eyes" medley which included the titular song and "Rhythm of the Night". It was included again on the setlist of her Showgirl: The Greatest Hits Tour in 2005 as part of the What Kylie Wants, Kylie Gets section. Minogue was unable to complete the tour as she was diagnosed with early breast cancer and had to cancel the Australian leg of the tour. The performance of the song was included in the Showgirl video album (2005).

Track listings

Australasian and UK CD1, UK cassette single
 "Please Stay"
 "Santa Baby"
 "Good Life"

Australasian and UK CD2
 "Please Stay"
 "Please Stay" (7th District Club Flava mix)
 "Please Stay" (Hatiras Dreamy dub)
 "Please Stay" (video)

European enhanced CD single
 "Please Stay"
 "Santa Baby"
 "Please Stay" (video)

UK 12-inch single
A1. "Please Stay" (7th District club dub)
B1. "Please Stay" (Hatiras Dreamy dub)
B2. "Please Stay" (7th District Club Flava mix)

Credits and personnel
Credits are lifted from the Light Years album booklet.

Studio
 Recorded and mixed at Studio 2 (Dublin, Ireland)

Personnel

 Kylie Minogue – writing, vocals
 Richard Stannard – writing, production
 Julian Gallagher – writing
 John Themis – writing, guitars
 Sharon Murphy – backing vocals
 Ash Howes – recording, mixing
 Alvin Sweeney – recording and mixing assistant
 Dave McCracken – Pro Tools

Charts

Certifications

Release history

References

2000 singles
2000 songs
Festival Records singles
Kylie Minogue songs
Latin pop songs
Parlophone singles
Song recordings produced by Richard Stannard (songwriter)
Songs written by John Themis
Songs written by Julian Gallagher
Songs written by Kylie Minogue
Songs written by Richard Stannard (songwriter)